The following highways are numbered 187:

Japan
 Japan National Route 187

United States
 U.S. Route 187 (former)
 Alabama State Route 187
 Arizona State Route 187
 Arkansas Highway 187
 California State Route 187
 Colorado State Highway 187
 Connecticut Route 187
 Florida State Road 187
 Georgia State Route 187
Hawaii Route 187
 Iowa Highway 187
 K-187 (Kansas highway)
 Kentucky Route 187
 Maine State Route 187
 Maryland Route 187
 Massachusetts Route 187
 Missouri Route 187
Montana Highway 187 (former)
 New Jersey Route 187
 New Mexico State Road 187
 New York State Route 187
 Ohio State Route 187
 Pennsylvania Route 187
 South Carolina Highway 187
 Tennessee State Route 187
 Texas State Highway 187 (former)
 Texas State Highway Loop 187
 Ranch to Market Road 187 (Texas)
 Utah State Route 187 (former)
 Virginia State Route 187
 Wisconsin Highway 187
Territories
 Puerto Rico Highway 187
 Puerto Rico Highway 187R